Robert Roeder may refer to:

Robert E. Roeder (1917–1944), recipient of the United States Medal of Honor
Robert Earl Roeder (1931–1998), historian and academic administrator
Robert G. Roeder (born 1942), received the Albert Lasker Award for Basic Medical Research